"If You Could Only See" is a song by American rock band Tonic from their debut studio album Lemon Parade (1996). It was released to radio as the third and final single from the album on March 18, 1997, by Polydor Records. Frontman Emerson Hart is the sole writer of the song, whilst production on the song was helmed by Jack Joseph Puig. According to Hart, the song was written as a result of his family disowning him due to their disapproval of Hart's relationship with an older woman.

"If You Could Only See" was a number-one hit on the US Billboard Mainstream Rock Tracks chart and reached number 11 on the Billboard Hot 100 Airplay chart, where it spent 63 weeks. In Australia, the song peaked at number 20 and spent 26 weeks in the top 50. As a result of its longevity on the Australian chart, it ended 1997 as the nation's 88th-highest-selling single and earned a Gold certification for shipments exceeding 35,000 copies. In Canada, the song peaked at number 18 on the RPM Top Singles chart and topped the Alternative 30 chart, ranking number 42 on the RPM year-end chart for 1997. The song is Tonic's most successful and has been described as "rock radio's most played song of 1997."

Background and writing
In an Australian television program (Live at the Chapel), Tonic lead vocalist Emerson Hart elucidated the meaning of this song. He stated that he had been in a relationship with an older woman and that his family did not approve of that relationship, and this song was written about that situation and was directed at his family.

In another interview, Hart said, "When I was 21 or 22, I was in love with somebody who my mom did not feel was a good fit. So my family disowned me for about three years. And the last conversation I had with my mother when I was home I’d said, 'if you could only see the way she loves me, maybe you would understand.' I just wrote that song, after that phone call, literally in a matter of minutes."

Recording and mixing
The recording sessions for "If You Could Only See" took place in Los Angeles and Hollywood, California at Sound City Studios and Devonshire Sound Studios, respectively. Production on the song was helmed by Jack Joseph Puig, with Puig also acting as a recording engineer. The song was recorded on a Neve Custom 8020 mixing console, using a Studer A80 tape recorder. Puig was also responsible for the mixing of the track, which was made at Andora Studios in Hollywood, California. Puig mixed the song on a Neve 8078 mixing console, using a Studer A800 tape recorder. Bob Ludwig mastered the track at Gateway Mastering in Portland, using an Ampex 499 as the master tape. WEA was responsible for the manufacturing of the single on both compact disc and cassette tape.

Critical reception
Shawn M. Haney of AllMusic referred to the song as "light and romantic," praising the song's texture and its slide guitars.

Music video
The music video was directed by Jeff Cutter and Ramaa Mosley.

Track listings and formats

 European CD single
 "If You Could Only See" (LP version) – 4:21
 "Open Up Your Eyes" (live at Melkweg, Amsterdam) – 7:04
 United Kingdom 7-inch vinyl
 "If You Could Only See" (edit) – 4:07
 "If You Could Only See" (acoustic version) – 4:17

 Australian and German CD single
 "If You Could Only See" (LP version) – 4:21
 "Open Up Your Eyes" (live at Melkweg, Amsterdam) – 7:04
 "Thick" (live at Melkweg, Amsterdam) – 4:53
 "Casual Affair" (live at Melkweg, Amsterdam) – 4:05
 Digital download
 "If You Could Only See" (25th Anniversary) – 4:26

Credits and personnel
Credits and personnel are adapted from the Lemon Parade album liner notes.
 Emerson Hart – writer, vocals, rhythm guitar, slide, percussion
 Jeff Russo – lead guitar, rhythm guitar, backing vocals, slide, percussion
 Dan Rothchild – bass, backing vocals, slide
 Kevin Shepard – drums, backing vocals
 Lenny Castro – percussion
 Jack Joseph Puig – production, recording and mixing at Sound City (Los Angeles) and Devonshire Studios (Hollywood)
 Bob Ludwig – mastering at Gateway Mastering (Portland)

Charts and certifications

Weekly charts

Year-end charts

Certifications

Release history

In popular culture
"If You Could Only See" is featured in the video games Karaoke Revolution Party and Band Hero.

References

External links
 

1995 songs
1997 singles
Polydor Records singles
Song recordings produced by Jack Joseph Puig
Tonic (band) songs